Matthew Dunlap (born November 26, 1964) is an American politician from Maine who is the Maine State Auditor. A Democrat, Dunlap served as Secretary of State of Maine from January 7, 2013, to January 4, 2021, and previously served in that same post from 2005 to 2011. In 2012, he sought to become his party's nominee to replace retiring Olympia Snowe, but lost in the primary to State Senator Cynthia Dill. Prior to his first election as Secretary of State in 2005, he represented Old Town in the Maine House of Representatives for four terms beginning in 1996. On December 2, 2020, Dunlap was elected Maine State Auditor by the Maine Legislature and took office on January 4, 2021. but had to vacate the position after failing the exams needed to meet the requirements of the position the following October, and was replaced by Jacob Norton. He did later meet the requirements and was selected for the position again on on November 14, 2022.

Early life, education, and early career
Matthew Dunlap was born and raised in Bar Harbor, Maine. He attended the Bar Harbor school system and graduated from Mount Desert Island High School, where he was a captain of the track team. He earned B.A. and M.A. degrees in history and English respectively from the University of Maine. Dunlap also completed the Senior Executives in State and Local Government program at Harvard University. Prior to entering politics, he worked in a variety of jobs including as a textile worker, fur trapper, publishing editor, radio talk-show host, cook, waiter, and bartender.

Maine House of Representatives

Elections
In 1996, Dunlap ran to represent Old Town in the Maine House of Representatives when incumbent Robert Keane retired after one term. Dunlap defeated Republican Sean Stillings with 48% of the vote. He won re-election in 1998 with 64% of the vote, in 2000 with 68% of the vote, and in 2002 ran unopposed.

Tenure
Dunlap served in the Maine House of Representatives from 1996 to 2004. He was actively involved in environmental and wildlife issues, including serving as House Chair of the Joint Standing Committee on Inland Fisheries and Wildlife. In 1999, he proposed restructuring the Atlantic Salmon Authority. He also supported legislation that increased moose hunting permits and sponsored a bill that would allow the Department of Inland Fisheries to contract with a consulting firm for the fisheries evaluation. He opposed the banning of deer decoys and the ultimately unsuccessful 2004 Question 2 referendum, which in his opinion would end bear hunting in the state.

Committee assignments
House Committee on Fish and Game (Chairman)
Joint Standing Committee on Inland Fisheries and Wildlife (Chairman)
House Committee on Reapportionment (Co-chairman)

Secretary of State
In 2004, Dunlap was elected Secretary of State of Maine by the Maine Legislature, a role in which he served from 2005 until 2011.  During his tenure as Secretary of State, Dunlap oversaw the modernization of the way the Secretary of State's office delivers services to the public electronically and directed the implementation of Maine's Military and Overseas Voter Empowerment (MOVE) Act, allowing military personnel and others abroad secure and prompt access to the ballot.  Dunlap also served as president of the National Association of Secretaries of State from 2010 until 2011.  After the Republican Party took control of the Maine Legislature in 2010, Dunlap was succeeded by State Senator Charlie Summers following a vote of 53% to 47%.

Dunlap was again selected to be Secretary of State by the Legislature after Democrats regained control of both its chambers in the 2012 elections. He took the oath of office on January 7, 2013.  He is the first person elected to non-consecutive terms as Secretary of State since 1880, when S.J. Chadbourne held the position after holding it from 1876 to 1878.

He was re-elected to his position in 2014, 2016, and 2018.

In addition to his service as Maine Secretary of State, he was also a member of the Presidential Advisory Commission on Election Integrity from May, 2017 to January, 2018.

Marijuana ballot measure
The Campaign To Regulate Marijuana Like Alcohol, a ballot initiative that sought to put the question of marijuana legalization before Maine voters in November 2016, sued the state of Maine for invalidating 26,779 signatures. The campaign had originally turned in 99,229 signatures from registered voters by the February 1 deadline in hopes of meeting the required number of 61,123 valid signatures to make the ballot. Dunlap invalidated the signatures because the signature of the notary who signed the petitions allegedly did not match the signature on file with staff. A court reversed Dunlap's decision after petition circulators sued, stating it was an error of law, and requiring him to reconsider the petitions rejected. Dunlap declined to appeal the decision.

State Auditor 
Dunlap reached the term limit for the office of Secretary of State in 2020, and announced that he would seek the position of state auditor for the following term. The state auditor is chosen by the Maine Legislature for a four-year term, renewable once.  Though Dunlap is not a certified public accountant as required by the law establishing the position, the law permits a person to be elected as long as they become a CPA within 9 months. He was elected as state auditor on December 2, 2020, by the Maine Legislature.  He announced on October 1, 2021, that he had failed the exams required to become a CPA, and must leave the position because he is not permitted to retake them for 60 days.

Dunlap did obtain the credentials needed for the position, and was selected by the Legislature again on November 14, 2022.

2012 U.S. Senate election

In November 2011, Dunlap took out the necessary paperwork to run against incumbent three-term Republican Olympia Snowe, who subsequently announced on February 28, 2012, that she had decided not to seek reelection.  On March 14, 2012, Dunlap filed with the office of the Maine Secretary of State the signatures necessary to qualify for the June primary ballot. Dunlap was endorsed by former Speaker of the Maine House of Representatives Glenn Cummings, the Maine chapter of the League of Young Voters and the Communications Workers of America Local 1400, among others. He finished second in the primary with 18,202 votes (35.64%), behind State Representative Cynthia Dill, who won with 22,629 votes (44.31%). Dill went on to finish third in the general election, behind Republican Charlie Summers and the winner, independent Angus King.

Personal life
Dunlap lives in Old Town, Maine, with his wife, State Representative Michelle Dunphy, and their daughter.  Dunlap is a founder of the Maine Youth Fish and Game Association and has served on the vestry of St. James' Episcopal Church in Old Town. He has also served as announcer for the Bangor Band.

Electoral history

References

External links
 Maine Secretary of State Biography
 Project Vote Smart Profile

|-

1964 births
21st-century American politicians
Candidates in the 2012 United States elections
Living people
Maine State Auditors
Democratic Party members of the Maine House of Representatives
People from Bar Harbor, Maine
People from Old Town, Maine
Secretaries of State of Maine
University of Maine alumni